William Alexander Bremner Smith (22 July 1902 – 21 December 1937) was a Scottish cricketer. A right-handed batsman and right-arm fast-medium bowler, he played once for the Scotland national cricket team in 1927.

Biography

Born in Greenock in 1902, he played club cricket for Greenock Cricket Club, taking 268 wickets at an average of 13.55. His first match against international opposition came for the West of Scotland Cricket Club against Australia in 1926. He played his only match for Scotland the following year, a first-class match against Ireland.

Soon after this, he moved to the Federated Malay States, and played twice for Malaya against Shanghai and Hong Kong in 1929. He played a match for the Federated Malay States against the Straits Settlements the following year, and played in the fixture a second time in 1934. He died in Kuala Lumpur in 1937.

References

1902 births
1937 deaths
Cricketers from Greenock
Federated Malay States cricketers
Malayan cricketers
Scottish cricketers